Angola is a country in Southern Africa and the seventh-largest on the continent.

Angola has vast mineral and petroleum reserves, and its economy is among the fastest growing in the world, especially since the end of the civil war. In spite of this, the standard of living remains low for the majority of the population, and life expectancy and infant mortality rates in Angola are among the worst in the world. Angola's economic growth is highly uneven, with the majority of the nation's wealth concentrated in a disproportionately small sector of the population.

Notable firms 
This list includes notable companies with primary headquarters located in the country. The industry and sector follow the Industry Classification Benchmark taxonomy. Organizations which have ceased operations are included and noted as defunct.

See also 
 Telecommunications in Angola

References

External links 
 Portal das Empresas do Governo (Companies house)
 US-Angola Chamber of Commerce

Angola